Larissa Vega is Miss El Salvador for Miss World 2014 and competed at Miss World 2014. She currently resides in San Salvador, where she is in school majoring in Communications.

References

External links
 Miss World Official Website
 Nuestra Belleza El Salvador
 Larissa Vega's Official Facebook

Nuestra Belleza El Salvador
Salvadoran beauty pageant winners
Living people
People from Santa Ana, El Salvador
Miss World 2014 delegates
1993 births